The Fresno California Temple is the 78th operating temple of the Church of Jesus Christ of Latter-day Saints (LDS Church).

History
California has long had a history with the LDS Church, starting with members who sailed to San Francisco aboard the Brooklyn and members of the U.S. Army unit known as the Mormon Battalion who were discharged in San Diego, many of whom stayed and helped build up the San Diego area.

A groundbreaking ceremony was in March 1999. Before the LDS temple was dedicated it was opened to the public. During that time 53,000 people toured the temple. On April 9, 2000 LDS Church president Gordon B. Hinckley dedicated the Fresno California Temple.
The Fresno California Temple has the same design as other smaller temples built worldwide during the same time. The exterior is white sierra granite and features a single-spire topped by a statue of the angel Moroni.

In 2020, the Fresno California Temple was closed in response to the coronavirus pandemic.

See also

 Comparison of temples of The Church of Jesus Christ of Latter-day Saints
 List of temples of The Church of Jesus Christ of Latter-day Saints
 List of temples of The Church of Jesus Christ of Latter-day Saints by geographic region
 Temple architecture (Latter-day Saints)
 The Church of Jesus Christ of Latter-day Saints in California

Additional reading

References

External links
 
 Official Fresno California Temple page
 Fresno California Temple at ChurchofJesusChristTemples.org

20th-century Latter Day Saint temples
Religious buildings and structures in Fresno, California
Culture of Fresno, California
Religious buildings and structures in Fresno County, California
Temples (LDS Church) completed in 2000
Temples (LDS Church) in California
2000 establishments in California